Anvil Press Poetry is an independent poetry publisher based in Greenwich, south-east London. It was founded in 1968 by Peter Jay and specialises in contemporary English poets, with a leavening of Irish and American, and in a range of translated poetry, from ancient classics to modern and contemporary poets.

The company's staff is at its full complement of two people: Peter Jay (founder, editorial and production director) and Kit Yee Wong (administration, rights)

References

External links
 Anvil Press Poetry website
 Interview at The Book Depository

Publishing companies of the United Kingdom
Publishing companies established in 1968